Valter Marković (born 16 October 1959 in Labin) is a former Croatian handball player.

Honours
RK Zamet
Yugoslav Third League (1): 1976–77
Yugoslav Second League (2): 1977–78, 1986–87

References

Yugoslav male handball players
Croatian male handball players
RK Zamet players
RK Zamet coaches
People from Labin
Handball players from Rijeka
1959 births
Living people